The 2012 Ulster Senior Hurling Championship was the 67th installment of the annual Ulster Senior Hurling Championship held under the auspices of the Ulster GAA. Antrim were the defending champions and successfully claimed their eleventh consecutive title, beating finalists Derry.

Format 
The draw for the Ulster championship was seeded, and took place in a single elimination format. Antrim received a bye to the final, Down to the semi-final.

There was no entry from the Ulster Championship to the 2012 All-Ireland Senior Hurling Championship proper. Antrim instead entered that competition through the preliminary round of the Leinster Senior Hurling Championship.

The other Ulster teams were not eligible, and took part in the 2012 Christy Ring Cup, the second tier All-Ireland hurling championship. Unlike in 2011, only four teams entered the competition this year.

Teams

Bracket

Box scores

Quarter-final

Semi-final

Final

References

External links 
 Ulster GAA website

Ulster Hurling Senior
Hurling
Ulster Senior Hurling Championship